The stripe-breasted wren (Cantorchilus thoracicus) is a species of bird in the family Troglodytidae. It is found in Honduras, Nicaragua, Costa Rica, and Panama.

Taxonomy and systematics

The stripe-breasted wren is monotypic. It has at times been treated as conspecific with the stripe-throated wren (Cantorchilus leucopogon) and the two form a superspecies.

Description

Adults have a gray-brown crown, dark umber shoulders, back, and rump, and a dull blackish tail with buffy bars. Their face and sides of the neck have white streaks over a blackish base. Their throat and chest have black, white, and gray lengthwise streaks that stop abruptly at the plain olive-brown lower belly. Juveniles' upperparts are more russet than the adults' and the throat and chest have grayish brown, white, and dusky stripes.

Distribution and habitat

The stripe-breasted wren is found on the Caribbean slope of Middle America from eastern Honduras south through northeastern Nicaragua and eastern Costa Rica into Panama almost to the Canal Zone. It inhabits thick vegetation along woodland edges, in clearings, and along streams; in Costa Rica it is also found in cacao and shade coffee plantations.

Behavior

Feeding

The stripe-breasted wren usually forages in low dense vegetation. Its diet has not been fully documented but is known to include insects and spiders.

Breeding

The stripe-breasted wren nests between March and July in Costa Rica. Both sexes build the nest; it has two chambers and is draped over a branch; a downward-facing entrance is in one chamber. The clutch size is two or three.

Vocalization

The stripe-breasted wren has two very different song types. One, which is apparently sung only by the male, is " a uniform series of whistles on one note" similar to that of some small owls. The other, sung by both sexes antiphonally, is "a cheerful series of liquid bubbling whistles." The species also has a variety of calls.

Status

The IUCN has assessed the stripe-breasted wren as being of Least Concern. It "appears able to adapt to very modified habitats, such as plantations" and occurs in some protected areas.

References

stripe-breasted wren
Birds of Nicaragua
Birds of Costa Rica
Birds of Panama
stripe-breasted wren
stripe-breasted wren
Taxonomy articles created by Polbot